WBII-CD, virtual and UHF digital channel 20, is a low-powered, Class A Sonlife-affiliated television station licensed to Holly Springs, Mississippi, United States and serving Northern Mississippi and Western Tennessee.

History

The station signed on March 4, 1994 as an affiliate of Network One.  It was also briefly affiliated with UPN at one point. When Network One shut down and ceased operations in 1998, the station then became an affiliate of Pursuit Channel. In fall of 2011, WBII dropped the Pursuit Channel and picked up Retro TV, after a nearby station in Memphis, Tennessee (which is CW affiliate WLMT on channel 30) dropped that affiliation from their second subchannel that same year in favor of MeTV. Additionally, WBII added two subchannels affiliated with Frost Great Outdoors on DT2, and PBJ on DT3. WBII carried Networks on all three of its subchannels that are owned by Luken Communications (owners of Retro Television Network, Frost Great Outdoors, and PBJ). In January 2016, WBII made drastic changes to its channel line up, dropping Retro Television Network, Frost Great Outdoors, and PBJ from its subchannels. The channel now has Sonlife Broadcasting Network (A religious network owned by Jimmy Swaggart) on its main subchannel and Tuff TV on its second subchannel. (Tuff TV was previously available in 2009-2011 on the stations second subchannel before being replaced by Frost Great Outdoors.) GOD TV was added to 20.3, and WBII added a fourth subchannel carrying Heartland.

Digital channels 
The station's digital signal is multiplexed:

External links

References 

BII-CD
Low-power television stations in the United States
1994 establishments in Mississippi
NewsNet affiliates